Tomáš Holubec (born 11 January 1976) is a Czech biathlete. He competed at the 2002 Winter Olympics and the 2006 Winter Olympics.

References

External links
 

1976 births
Living people
Czech male biathletes
Olympic biathletes of the Czech Republic
Biathletes at the 2002 Winter Olympics
Biathletes at the 2006 Winter Olympics
People from Jilemnice
Sportspeople from the Liberec Region